Presidents of the United States have often acquired nicknames, both flattering and unflattering. This list is intended to note those nicknames that were in common use at the time they were in office or shortly thereafter.

George Washington
 The American Cincinnatus: Like the famous Roman, he won a war, then became a private citizen instead of seeking power or riches as a reward. He became the first president general of the Society of the Cincinnati, formed by Revolutionary War officers who also "declined offers of power and position to return to his home and plough".
 The American Fabius for his Fabian military strategy during the Revolutionary War
 The Father of His Country

John Adams
 The Colossus of Independence for his leadership in Congress in 1776
 Old Sink or Swim, for the speech in which he vowed "sink or swim, live or die, survive or perish, I am with my country from this day on."
 His Rotundity for his girthy bodily figure

Thomas Jefferson
 The Apostle of Democracy
 The Man of the People
 The Sage of Monticello

James Madison
 Little Jemmy or His Little Majesty: at only , the shortest U.S. president
 Father of the Constitution

James Monroe
 The Era of Good Feelings President for "The Era of Good Feelings", the period following the War of 1812, during which America became less divided politically, to the extent that the only opponents of the ruling Democratic Republicans, the Federalist Party, went out of existence. It was not until resistance to Andrew Jackson's policies produced the Whig Party that oppositional politics resumed in the United States.
 The Last Cocked Hat because he was the last U.S. president to wear a tricorne hat according to the old-fashioned style of the 18th century.

John Quincy Adams

 Old Man Eloquent or The Abolitionist: famed for routinely bringing up the slavery issue against Congressional rules, and for his role later on in the Amistad case. He is the only American president to be elected to the House of Representatives after his presidency. The nickname gained currency as a result of his campaign against slavery waged as a congressman, and as the attorney in the Amistad case.

Andrew Jackson
 The Hero of New Orleans for his military victory in the Battle of New Orleans
 Old Hickory, allegedly given to him by his soldiers for being as "tough as old hickory"
 King Mob
 King Andrew for his supposedly excessive use of the veto power
 Jackass: Andrew Jackson's critics disparaged him as a "Jackass"; however, Jackson embraced the animal, making it the unofficial symbol of the Democratic Party.

Martin Van Buren
 The American Talleyrand
 The Careful Dutchman: Van Buren's first language was Dutch.
 The Enchanter
 The Great Manager
 The Master Spirit
 Martin Van Ruin
 Matty Van from "Tippecanoe Songs of 1840"
 The Mistletoe Politician, so called by Joseph Peyton of Tennessee, a Whig opponent, who charged that "Martin Van Buren was a mere political parasite, a branch of mistletoe, that owed its elevation, its growth--nay, its very existence, to the tall trunk of an aged hickory" (i.e. Andrew Jackson).
 Old Kinderhook (OK), a reference to his home town
 Red Fox of Kinderhook, a reference to his red hair and home town
 The Little Magician: given to him during his time in the state of New York, because of his smooth politics and short stature

William Henry Harrison
 General Mum, as in the expression, "keep it mum," because of his avoidance of speaking out on controversial issues during his election campaign
 Tippecanoe or also Old Tippecanoe, a reference to Harrison's victory at the 1811 Battle of Tippecanoe; used in the campaign song Tippecanoe and Tyler Too during the 1840 presidential election
 Washington of the West, a reference to Harrison's victories at the 1811 Battle of Tippecanoe and 1813 Battle of the Thames

John Tyler
 His Accidency, a nickname given by his opponents; the first president to be elevated to the presidency by the death of his predecessor, William Henry Harrison

James K. Polk
 Napoleon of the Stump for his short stature and potent oratory skills
 Young Hickory because he was a particular protégé of "Old Hickory", Andrew Jackson

Zachary Taylor
 Old Rough and Ready

Millard Fillmore
 The American Louis Philippe

Franklin Pierce
 Young Hickory of the Granite Hills: "Young Hickory" compared his military deeds (in the Mexican–American War) with those of Andrew Jackson. "The Granite Hills" were his home state of New Hampshire
 Handsome Frank

James Buchanan
 Old Public Functionary, used by Buchanan in his December 1859 State of the Union address and adopted by newspapers
 Old Buck, from a shortening of his last name, used later in life
 Bachelor President, per his unmarried status
 Ten-Cent Jimmy: derogatory, as a reaction to Buchanan's campaign statement that ten cents a day was decent pay for a worker

Abraham Lincoln
 The Ancient One, a nickname favored by White House insiders because of his "ancient wisdom"
 The Great Emancipator and The Liberator for the emancipation of the slaves
 Honest Abe
 The Rail-Splitter
 The Tycoon, for the energetic and ambitious conduct of his Civil War administration
 Uncle Abe for his avuncularity in his later years

Andrew Johnson
 The Tennessee Tailor for his career as a tailor before going into politics

Ulysses S. Grant
 Uncle Sam Grant, a name given to him by his classmates at West Point
 Unconditional Surrender Grant, a backronym for his uncompromising demand for unconditional surrender during the Battle of Fort Donelson in 1862, which made him a hero

Rutherford B. Hayes
 Rutherfraud or His Fraudulency, because after the disputed results of the 1876 Election, many Democrats did not consider him legitimately to be president

James Garfield
 Boatman Jim, referencing his work on the Ohio canals in his youth
 Preacher President

Chester A. Arthur
 Chet, shortened version of his name used by publications of that era
 Gentleman Boss, as the dapper leader of New York State's Republican party
 Prince Arthur and The Dude President for his fancy attire and indulgence in extravagant luxury

Grover Cleveland
 His Obstinacy; he vetoed more bills than the first 21 presidents combined
 Uncle Jumbo
 Grover the Good for his honesty and public integrity

Benjamin Harrison
 The Front Porch Campaigner; during the 1888 election, he gave nearly ninety speeches from his front porch to crowds gathered in the yard of his Indianapolis home; this nickname has been widely but erroneously attributed to William McKinley
 The Human Iceberg, although he could warmly engage a crowd with his speeches, he was cold and detached when speaking with people on an individual basis
 Little Ben, given to him by Democrats of his era because of his stature; this could also be a reference to his being the grandson of former president William Henry Harrison, who had served fifty years before

William McKinley
 The Napoleon of Protection, referring to high tariffs such as the one he wrote in 1890
 Big Bill

Theodore Roosevelt
 The Hero of San Juan Hill for leading his Rough Riders up San Juan Hill during the Battle of Santiago de Cuba in 1898
 The Lion
 Teddy: Used in The New York Times at least as early as 1900, even though he hated the nickname
 TR for signing communications this way; perhaps the first president to be known by his initials
 The Trust Buster, so called as a pioneer of busting business trusts
 The Colonel, for his rank in the Spanish–American War

William Howard Taft
 Big Chief
 Big Lub, boyhood nickname

Woodrow Wilson
 The Phrasemaker: as an acclaimed historian, Wilson had no need of speech-writers to supply his oratorical eloquence
 The Schoolmaster: a bespectacled academic who lectured his visitors

Warren G. Harding
 Wobbly Warren

Calvin Coolidge
 Cautious Cal
 Cool Cal: His reelection campaign used the slogan, "Keep It Cool With Coolidge"
 Silent Cal

Herbert Hoover
 The Great Engineer and The Great Humanitarian: He was a civil engineer of some distinction and when the Mississippi burst its banks in 1927, engulfing thousands of acres of agricultural land, he volunteered his services and did extensive flood control work. The latter nickname would later be used facetiously in reference to his perceived indifference to the hardships faced by his constituents during the Great Depression. However, the nickname dates back to 1921, when the ARA under Hoover saved millions of Russians suffering from famine. "It was such considerations that Walter Lippmann took into account when he wrote of Hoover's Russian undertaking in the New York World in May 1922: 'probably no other living man could have done nearly so much.'"
 The Chief, a nickname picked up at 23 as a geologist surveying in the Australian Outback, that stuck for the rest of his life

Franklin D. Roosevelt
 FDR
 That Man in the White House
Sphinx

Harry S. Truman
 Give 'Em Hell Harry (also a campaign slogan)

Dwight D. Eisenhower
 Ike, known for being in his campaign slogan "I like Ike"

John F. Kennedy
 Jack, Kennedy was usually referred to as either "John F. Kennedy" or "Jack Kennedy". See also Senator, you're no Jack Kennedy.
 JFK, most prominent nickname and abbreviation of his full name

Lyndon B. Johnson
 Bullshit Johnson (Bull Johnson in public) for his reputation for boasting at Southwest Texas State Teachers College
 Landslide Lyndon, ironic reference to the Box 13 scandal, a hotly disputed 87-vote win that put him into the Senate in 1948, which became more appropriate in his supporters' eyes following his victory in the 1964 presidential election
 Light-Bulb Lyndon, because he hated wasting electricity, and would often storm around the White House shutting off unnecessary lights
 LBJ; he liked to be known by this abbreviation, which was used in the campaign slogan, "All the way with LBJ"; later it would be used in the Anti-Vietnam War political slogan "Hey, hey, LBJ, how many kids did you kill today?"

Richard Nixon
 Tricky Dick, from a Democratic Party ad leading up to the 1950 U.S. Senate election in California saying "Look at 'Tricky Dick' Nixon's Republican Record"

Gerald Ford
 Jerry
 Mr. Nice Guy for his clean-cut and non-partisan image

Jimmy Carter
 Jimmy, the first president to use his nickname in an official capacity, rather than his first name James.
 The Peanut Farmer, he owned a peanut farm and fostered this image in his early campaigns, as a contrast to elite Washington insiders

Ronald Reagan
 Dutch: shortly after his birth, his father said he looked like a "fat little Dutchman"; reinforced when he wore a Dutch boy haircut (see pageboy) as a youngster
 The Great Communicator for his ability to communicate
 The Gipper, after his role as George "The Gipper" Gipp in the film Knute Rockne, All American. Gipp exhorted his teammates to "Win one for the Gipper".
 The Teflon President, coined by Rep. Patricia Schroeder because nothing negative "stuck to" him (like a Teflon skillet); he remained blame-free in the eyes of the American people

George H. W. Bush
 41, Papa Bush, Bush 41, Bush Senior, Senior, and similar names that were used after his son George W. Bush became the 43rd president, to differentiate between the two
 Poppy, a nickname used from childhood on

Bill Clinton
 Bubba, common nickname for males in the Southern U.S.
 Slick Willie, a term originally coined when he was Governor of Arkansas and popularized by newspaper Pine Bluff Commercial, whose staff disagreed with his political views.
 The Comeback Kid, coined by press after strong second place showing in 1992 New Hampshire primary, following polling slump
 The First Black President, used by Toni Morrison in reference to the African-American tropes surrounding Clinton's candidacy
 The Big Dog, used by several media outlets in regard to his post-presidential popularity

George W. Bush
 43, Bush Jr., Junior, Bush 43, and similar names, used to differentiate him from his father
 Dubya, or Dumb Dubyah, based on a Texas pronunciation of "W"

Barack Obama

 No Drama Obama, for his cautious and meticulous presidential campaign in 2007–08 and for his patient, relaxed demeanor
 Deporter in Chief, for deporting more than 3 million undocumented immigrants during his administration, more than any of his predecessors

Donald Trump

 The Donald since his first wife Ivana Trump referred to him as such in a 1989 Spy magazine cover story
 45, the 45, and similar names, referencing his being the 45th president, and his penchant for wearing monogrammed "45" apparel
 Conspiracy Theorist-in-Chief, for his penchant for promoting conspiracy theories
 President Snowflake and Snowflake-in-Chief using the term "Snowflake", for his poor reactions to criticism, particularly on Twitter and regarding the Mueller probe and related investigations
 Donald Drumpf, popularized by British-American comedian John Oliver in a segment of his show
 The Great MAGA King, used by Joe Biden in 2022 during a fundraiser.

Joe Biden 
 Amtrak Joe, from his association with Amtrak trains, which he would use to commute to Washington, D.C.
 Brandon, Dark Brandon or Joe Brandon, based on the anti-Biden political slogan "Let's Go Brandon".
 Diamond Joe, became common usage from portrayals of Joe Biden in the satirical magazine The Onion
 Middle Class Joe, from his being the poorest United States Senator
 Sleepy Joe, and Sloppy Joe, pejorative nickname used by opponent Donald Trump and his supporters, most prominently in the 2020 United States presidential election, to attack Biden as 'mentally slow'
 Uncle Joe and Uncle-in-Chief, also derived from portrayals in The Onion

See also

 
 List of nicknames of prime ministers of the United Kingdom
 List of nicknames of prime ministers of Australia
 List of nicknames used by George W. Bush 
 List of nicknames used by Donald Trump

Notes
1. He has gained fame around the world as a quintessential example of a benevolent national founder. Gordon Wood concludes that the greatest act in his life was his resignation as commander of the armies—an act that stunned aristocratic Europe. The earliest known image in which Washington is identified as such is on the cover of the circa 1778 Pennsylvania German almanac (Lancaster: Gedruckt bey Francis Bailey).
2. Compare to Italian Prime Minister (and former President of the European Commission) Romano Prodi's nickname Il Professore (the professor/schoolteacher).

References

 
 
 

United States